The Athletics at the 2016 Summer Paralympics – Men's 400 metres T37 event at the 2016 Paralympic Games took place on 15–16 September 2016, at the Estádio Olímpico João Havelange.

Heats

Heat 1 
11:45 15 September 2016:

Heat 2 
11:52 15 September 2016:

Final 
10:23 16 September 2016:

Notes

Athletics at the 2016 Summer Paralympics
2016 in men's athletics